Karwice may refer to the following places:
Karwice, Łódź Voivodeship (central Poland)
Karwice, Drawsko County in West Pomeranian Voivodeship (north-west Poland)
Karwice, Sławno County in West Pomeranian Voivodeship (north-west Poland)